Estonia has 37 shopping malls with more than  square meters of gross leasable area. Nearly half of them lie in Tallinn, however the largest one in the country is Lõunakeskus in Tartu. The rest are spread across 9 towns in all corners of the country.

New shopping malls are unlikely to come by in the future, as there have long been debates about the oversaturation and overabundance of shopping malls. This was only worsened by the onset of the COVID-19 pandemic and it's economic implications, as was shown by T1, which went bankrupt only three years after opening. Further expansions, as shown by the plans of Ülemiste, are more multifunctional and intend to widen the scope of the centre's purpose.

List 
The list was last updated in 10/2022.

See also
List of supermarket chains in Estonia
List of markets in Estonia

References 

Estonia
Shopping centres